Membrane bioreactor (MBR) is a combination of membrane processes like microfiltration or ultrafiltration with a biological wastewater treatment process, the activated sludge process. It is now widely used for municipal and industrial wastewater treatment. The two basic MBR configurations are a submerged membrane bioreactor (SMBR), and a side stream membrane bioreactor. In the SMBR configuration, the membrane is located inside the biological reactor and submerged in the wastewater, while in a side stream membrane bioreactor, the membrane is located outside the reactor, as an additional step after biological treatment.

Overview
Water scarcity has prompted efforts to reuse it once it has been properly treated, known as water reclamation (also called wastewater reuse, water reuse or water recycling). Among the treatment technologies available to reclaim wastewater, membrane processes stand out for their capacity to retain solids and salts and even disinfect water, producing water suitable for reuse in irrigation and other applications.

A membrane is a material that allows the selective flow of certain substances. 
In the case of water purification or regeneration, the aim is for the water to flow through the membrane, retaining undesirable particles on the other side. Depending on the type of membrane, it is possible to get better pollutant retention. Different types of materials can be used to manufacture the membrane. However, in the field of wastewater treatment and due to the several operational restrictions, the number of materials that are used to construct a membrane is different than that in the other fields. Some of the required characteristics in a membrane for wastewater treatments are chemical and mechanical resistance for five years of operation, highly acidic or basic properties, or adaptability to operate in a wide range of pH.

There are two main types of membrane materials available on the market: organic-based polymeric membranes and ceramic membranes. Polymeric membranes are the most commonly used material in water and wastewater treatment. In particular, polyvinylidene difluoride (PVDF) is the most popular one due to its long lifetime and chemical and mechanical resistance.  

When used with domestic wastewater, MBR processes can produce effluent of high enough quality for discharge into the sea, oceans, surfaces, brackish bodies, or waterways for usage in urban irrigation. Other advantages of MBR's over conventional processes include a small footprint, easy retrofit, and upgradation of old wastewater treatment plants.

It is possible to operate MBR processes at higher mixed liquor suspended solids (MLSS) concentrations compared to conventional settlement separation systems, thus reducing the reactor volume to achieve the same loading rate.

Two MBR configurations exist: internal/submerged, where the membranes are immersed in and integral to the biological reactor; and external/side stream, where membranes are a separate unit process requiring an intermediate pumping step.

Recent technical innovation and significant membrane cost reduction have enabled MBRs to become an established process option to treat wastewater. As a result, the MBR process has now become an attractive option for the treatment and reuse of industrial and municipal wastewater, as evidenced by their constantly rising numbers and capacity. The current MBR market has been estimated to be worth around US$216 million in 2006 and to rise to US$363 million by 2010.

Based on the estimated global MBR market of US$838.2 million in 2011, the MBR is projected to grow at an average rate of 22.4%, reaching a total market size of US$3.44 billion in 2018.

The global membrane bioreactor market is expected to grow in the near future, because of various driving forces, for instance, the scarcity of water worldwide, which makes wastewater reclamation invariably necessary. This will be further aggravated by climate change. The growing environmental concerns over industrial wastewater disposal along with the declining freshwater resources across developing economies also account for the demand of MBR technology. Population growth, urbanization, and industrialization will further complicate the business outlook. Depending on their composition, these changes can be demanding on natural resources and pose unsustainable challenges to the environment. Therefore, membrane bioreactor (MBR) technology is regarded as a key element of advanced wastewater treatment and reuse schemes and it is focused to grow towards sustainable water management across the municipal and industrial sectors.

However, high initial investments and operational expenditure may hamper the global membrane bioreactor market. In addition, technological restraints, including the recurrence of fouling in the MBR's, are likely to hinder production adoption. Ongoing R&D progressions toward increasing output and minimizing sludge formation are anticipated to fuel industry growth.

Membrane bioreactors can be used to reduce the footprint of an activated sludge sewage treatment system by removing some of the liquid components of the mixed liquor. This leaves a concentrated waste product that is then treated using the activated sludge process.

Recent studies show the opportunity to use nanomaterials for the realization of more efficient and sustainable membrane bioreactors (Nanomaterials Membrane Bioreactor - NMs-MBR) for wastewater treatment.

History and basic operating parameters
The MBR process was introduced in the late 1960s, as soon as commercial-scale ultrafiltration (UF) and microfiltration (MF) membranes were available. The original process was introduced by Dorr-Oliver Inc. and it combined the use of an activated sludge bioreactor with a cross-flow membrane filtration loop. The flat sheet membranes used in this process were polymeric and featured pore sizes ranging from 0.003 to 0.01 μm. Although the idea of replacing the settling tank of the conventional activated sludge process was attractive, it was difficult to justify the use of such a process because of the high cost of membranes, the low economic value of the product (tertiary effluent) and the potential rapid loss of performance due to membrane fouling. As a result, the focus was on the attainment of high fluxes, and it was, therefore, necessary to pump the MLSS at high cross-flow velocity at significant energy demand (of the order 10 kWh/m3 product) to reduce fouling. Because of the poor economics of the first-generation MBRs, they only found applications in niche areas with special needs, such as isolated trailer parks or ski resorts.

The breakthrough for the MBR came in 1989 with Yamamoto and co-workers' idea of submerging the membranes in the bioreactor. Until then, MBRs were designed with a separation device located external to the reactor (side stream MBR) and relied on high trans-membrane pressure (TMP) to maintain filtration. With the membrane directly immersed in the bioreactor, submerged MBR systems are usually preferred to the sidestream configuration, especially, for domestic wastewater treatment. The submerged configuration relies on coarse bubble aeration to produce mixing and limit fouling. The energy demand of the submerged system can be up to 2 orders of magnitude lower than that of the side stream systems and submerged systems operate at a lower flux, demanding more membrane area. In submerged configurations, aeration is considered as one of the major parameters in process performance both hydraulic and biological. Aeration maintains solids in suspension, scours the membrane surface, and provides oxygen to the biomass, leading to better biodegradability and cell synthesis.

The other key steps in the recent MBR development were the acceptance of modest fluxes (25 percent or less of those in the first generation), and the idea to use two-phase bubbly flow to control fouling. The lower operating cost obtained with the submerged configuration along with the steady decrease in the membrane cost led to an exponential increase in MBR plant installations from the mid-90s. Since then, further improvements in the MBR design and operation have been introduced and incorporated into larger plants. While earlier MBRs were operated at solid retention times (SRT) as high as 100 days with MLSS up to 30 g/L, the recent trend is to apply lower solid retention times (around 10–20 days), resulting in more manageable MLSS levels (10 to 15 g/L). Thanks to these new operating conditions, the oxygen transfer and the pumping cost in the MBR have tended to decrease and the overall maintenance has been simplified. There is now a range of MBR systems commercially available, most of which use submerged membranes although some external modules are available; these external systems also use two-phase flow for fouling control. Typical hydraulic retention times (HRT) range between 3 and 10 hours. In terms of membrane configurations, mainly hollow fiber and flat sheet membranes are utilized in MBR applications.

Despite the more favorable energy usage of submerged membranes, there continued to be a market for the side stream configuration, particularly in smaller flow industrial applications. For ease of maintenance, the sidestream configuration can be installed on a lower level in a plant building. Membrane replacement can be undertaken without specialized lifting equipment. As a result, research continued with the sidestream configuration, during which time it was found that full-scale plants could be operated with higher fluxes. This has culminated in recent years with the development of low energy systems which incorporate more sophisticated control of the operating parameters coupled with periodic backwashes, which enable sustainable operation at energy usage as low as 0.3 kWh/m3 of product.

Configurations

Internal/submerged/immersed 

In the immersed Membrane Bioreactor (iMBR) configuration, the filtration element is installed in either the main bioreactor vessel or in a separate tank. The modules are positioned above the aeration system, fulfilling two functions, the supply of oxygen and the cleaning of the membranes. The membranes can be a flat sheet or tubular or a combination of both and can incorporate an online backwash system which reduces membrane surface fouling by pumping membrane permeate back through the membrane. 
The backwash system can be optimized using IPC membranes, as developed by Blue Foot Membranes. In systems where the membranes are in a separate tank from the bioreactor, individual trains of membranes can be isolated to undertake cleaning regimes incorporating membrane soaks, however, the biomass must be continuously pumped back to the main reactor to limit MLSS concentration increase. Additional aeration is also required to provide air scouring to reduce fouling. Where the membranes are installed in the main reactor, membrane modules are removed from the vessel and transferred to an offline cleaning tank. Usually, the internal/submerged configuration is used for larger-scale lower strength applications. To optimize the reactor volume and minimize the production of sludge, submerged MBR systems typically operate with MLSS concentrations comprised between 12000 mg/L and 20000 mg/L, hence they offer good flexibility in the selection of the design Sludge retention time. It is mandatory to take into account that an excessively high content of Mixed liquor suspended solids may render the aeration system to be not so effective and the useful flux of water treated by the membrane would decrease; the classical solution to this optimization problem is to ensure a concentration of mixed liquor suspended solids which approaches 10.000 mg/L, to guarantee a good mass transfer of oxygen with a good permeate flux. This type of solution is widely accepted in larger-scale units, where the internal/submerged configuration is typically used, because of the higher relative cost of the membrane, compared to the additional volume required into the tank.

Immersed MBR has been the preferred configuration due to its low energy consumption level, high biodegradation efficiency, and low fouling rate compared to sidestream membrane bioreactors. In addition, iMBR systems can handle higher SSLM concentrations, while traditional systems work with an MLSS concentration between 2.5-3.5, iMBR can handle a concentration between 4-12 g/L, an increase of 300%. This type of configuration is adopted in industrial sectors, including textile, food & beverages, oil & gas, mining, power generation, pulp & paper in light of its benefits.

External/side stream
In sMBR technology, the filtration modules are outside the aerobic tank, hence the name side-stream configuration. Like the iMBR configuration, the aeration system is also used to clean and supply oxygen to the bacteria that degrade the organic compounds. The biomass is either pumped directly through several membrane modules in series and back to the bioreactor, or the biomass is pumped to a bank of modules, from which a second pump circulates the biomass through the modules in series. Cleaning and soaking of the membranes can be undertaken in situ with the use of an installed cleaning tank, pump, and pipework. The quality of the final product is such that it can be reused in process applications due to the filtration capacity of the micro- and ultrafiltration membranes.

Usually, the external/side stream configuration is used for small-scale higher strength applications; the main advantage that the external/side stream configuration shows is the possibility to design and size the tank and the membrane separately, with practical advantages for the operation and the maintenance of the unit. As in other membrane processes, a shear over the membrane surface is needed to prevent or limit fouling; the external/side stream configuration provides this shear using a pumping system, while the internal/submerged configuration provides the shear through the aeration in the bioreactor, and since there is an energy requirement to promote the shear, this configuration shows this additional cost. Moreover, the MBR module fouling is more consistent, due to the higher fluxes involved in this configuration.

Comparison of both configurations
Finally, in order to have a comparison of the characteristics and capabilities of the two configurations, a few points are given below where they are compared:
- iMBR offers a lower cleaning frequency, and lower energy consumption, but, otherwise, sMBR can handle higher concentrations than iMBR could MLSS (Mixed liquor suspended solids). For this reason, it is easier to carry out maintenance operations, module replacements and cleanings, since the system is more compact.

Major considerations

Fouling and fouling control
The MBR filtration performance inevitably decreases with filtration time. This is due to the deposition of soluble and particulate materials onto and into the membrane, attributed to the interactions between activated sludge components and the membrane. This major drawback and process limitation has been under investigation since the earlier MBRs, and remains one of the most challenging issues facing further MBR development.

Fouling is the process by which the particles (colloidal particles, solute macromolecules) are deposited or adsorbed onto the membrane surface or pores by physical and chemical interactions or mechanical action. This produces a reduction in size or blockage of membrane pores.

Membrane fouling can cause severe flux drops and affects the quality of the water produced. Severe fouling may require intense chemical cleaning or membrane replacement. This increases the operating costs of a treatment plant. Membrane fouling has traditionally been thought to occur through four mechanisms: 1) complete pore blocking, 2) standard blocking, 3) intermediate blocking, and 4) cake layer formation. There are various types of foulants: biological (bacteria, fungi), colloidal (clays, flocs), scaling (mineral precipitates), and organic (oils, polyelectrolytes, (humics).

Membrane fouling can be recognized either by the reduction in permeation flux while holding Transmembrane Pressure (TMP) constant or an increase in Transmembrane Pressure in constant flux mode. Nevertheless, most of the wastewater treatment plants are operated in constant flux mode. Hence, fouling phenomena generally are perceived by observing the variation of TMP with time. In recent reviews covering membrane applications to bioreactors, it has been shown that, as with other membrane separation processes, membrane fouling is the most serious problem affecting system performance. Fouling leads to a significant increase in hydraulic resistance, manifested as permeate flux declines or transmembrane pressure (TMP) increases when the process is operated under constant-TMP or constant-flux conditions respectively. In systems where flux is maintained by increasing TMP, the energy required to achieve filtration increases. Alternatively, frequent membrane cleaning is therefore required, increasing, significantly, the operating costs as a result of cleaning agents and production downtime. More frequent membrane replacement is also expected.

Membrane fouling results from the interaction between the membrane material and the components of the activated sludge liquor, which include biological flocs formed by a large range of living or dead microorganisms along with soluble and colloidal compounds. The suspended biomass has no fixed composition and varies with feed water composition and MBR operating conditions. Thus, though many investigations of membrane fouling have been published, the diverse range of operating conditions and feedwater matrices employed, the different analytical methods used, and the limited information reported in most studies on the suspended biomass composition, have made it difficult to establish any generic behavior pertaining to membrane fouling in MBRs specifically.

The air-induced cross flow obtained in submerged MBR can efficiently remove or at least reduce the fouling layer on the membrane surface. A recent review reports the latest findings on applications of aeration in submerged membrane configuration and describes the enhancement of performances offered by gas bubbling. As an optimal air flow rate has been identified behind which further increases in aeration have no effect on fouling removal, the choice of aeration rate is a key parameter in MBR design.

Many other antifouling strategies can be applied to MBR applications. They comprise, for example:
Intermittent permeation or relaxation, where the filtration is stopped at regular time intervals before being resumed. Particles deposited on the membrane surface tend to diffuse back to the reactor; this phenomenon being increased by the continuous aeration applied during this resting period.
Membrane backwashing, where permeate water is pumped back to the membrane, and flows through the pores to the feed channel, dislodging internal and external foulants.
Air backwashing, where pressurized air in the membrane's permeate side builds up and releases a significant pressure within a very short period of time. Membrane modules, therefore, need to be in a pressurized vessel coupled to a vent system. Air usually does not go through the membrane. If it did, the air would dry the membrane and a re-wet step would be necessary, by pressurizing the feed side of the membrane.
Proprietary antifouling products, such as Nalco's Membrane Performance Enhancer Technology.

In addition, different types/intensities of chemical cleaning may also be recommended:
Chemically enhanced backwash (daily);
Maintenance cleaning with higher chemical concentration (weekly);
Intensive chemical cleaning (once or twice a year).

Intensive cleaning is also carried out when further filtration cannot be sustained because of an elevated transmembrane pressure (TMP). Each of the four main MBR suppliers (Kubota, Evoqua, Mitsubishi and GE Water) have their own chemical cleaning recipes, which differ mainly in terms of concentration and methods (see Table 1). Under normal conditions, the prevalent cleaning agents remain NaOCl (sodium hypochlorite) and citric acid. It is common for MBR suppliers to adapt specific protocols for chemical cleanings (i.e. chemical concentrations and cleaning frequencies) for individual facilities.

Biological performances/kinetics

COD removal and sludge yield
Simply due to the high number of microorganisms in MBRs, the pollutants uptake rate can be increased. This leads to better degradation in a given time span or to smaller required reactor volumes. In comparison to the conventional activated sludge process (ASP) which typically achieves 95 percent, COD removal can be increased to 96 to 99 percent in MBRs (see table,). COD and BOD5 removal is found to increase with MLSS concentration. Above 15 g/L COD removal becomes almost independent of biomass concentration at >96 percent. Arbitrary high MLSS concentrations are not employed, however, as oxygen transfer is impeded due to higher and non-Newtonian fluid viscosity. Kinetics may also differ due to easier substrate access. In ASP, flocs may reach several 100 μm in size. This means that the substrate can reach the active sites only by diffusion which causes an additional resistance and limits the overall reaction rate (diffusion-controlled). Hydrodynamic stress in MBRs reduces floc size (to 3.5 μm in side stream MBRs) and thereby increases the apparent reaction rate. Like in the conventional ASP, sludge yield is decreased at higher SRT or biomass concentration. Little or no sludge is produced at sludge loading rates of 0.01 kgCOD/(kgMLSS d). Because of the imposed biomass concentration limit, such low loading rates would result in enormous tank sizes or long HRTs in conventional ASP.

Nutrient removal
Nutrient removal is one of the main concerns in modern wastewater treatment, especially, in areas that are sensitive to eutrophication. Nitrogen (N) is a pollutant present in wastewater that must be eliminated for multiple reasons: it reduces dissolved oxygen in surface waters, is toxic to the aquatic ecosystem, poses a risk to public health, and together with phosphorus (P), are responsible for the excessive growth of photosynthetic organisms like algae. All these factors make its reduction focus on wastewater treatment. In wastewater, nitrogen can be present in multiple forms. 
Like in the conventional ASP, currently, the most widely applied technology for N-removal from municipal wastewater is nitrification combined with denitrification, carried out by bacteria nitrifying and the involvement of facultative organisms. 
Besides phosphorus precipitation, enhanced biological phosphorus removal (EBPR) can be implemented which requires an additional anaerobic process step. Some characteristics for MBR technology render EBPR in combination with post-denitrification an attractive alternative that achieves very low nutrient effluent concentrations. 
For this, a MBR benefits the retention of solids, which provides a better biotreatment, supporting the development of slower-growing microorganisms, especially nitrifying ones, so that it makes them especially effective in the elimination of N (nitrification).

Anaerobic MBRs
Anaerobic MBRs (sometimes abbreviated AnMBR) were introduced in the 1980s in South Africa and currently see a renaissance in research. However, anaerobic processes are normally used when a low-cost treatment is required that enables energy recovery but does not achieve advanced treatment (low carbon removal, no nutrients removal). In contrast, membrane-based technologies enable advanced treatment (disinfection), but at a high energy cost. Therefore, the combination of both can only be economically viable if a compact process for energy recovery is desired, or when disinfection is required after anaerobic treatment (cases of water reuse with nutrients). If maximal energy recovery is desired, a single anaerobic process will always be superior to a combination with a membrane process.

Recently, anaerobic MBRs have seen successful full-scale application to the treatment of some types of industrial wastewaters—typically high-strength wastes. Example applications include the treatment of alcohol stillage wastewater in Japan and the treatment of salad dressing/barbecue sauce wastewater in the United States.

Mixing and hydrodynamics
Like in any other reactors, the hydrodynamics (or mixing) within an MBR plays an important role in determining the pollutant removal and fouling control within an MBR. It has a substantial effect on the energy usage and size requirements of an MBR, therefore the whole life cost of an MBR is high.

The removal of pollutants is greatly influenced by the length of time fluid elements spend in the MBR (i.e. the residence time distribution or RTD). The residence time distribution is a description of the hydrodynamics/mixing in the system and is determined by the design of the MBR (e.g. MBR size, inlet/recycle flowrates, wall/baffle/mixer/aerator positioning, mixing energy input). An example of the effect of mixing is that a continuous stirred-tank reactor will not have as high pollutant conversion per unit volume of reactor as a plug flow reactor.

The control of fouling, as previously mentioned, is primarily undertaken using coarse bubble aeration. The distribution of bubbles around the membranes, the shear at the membrane surface for cake removal and the size of the bubble are greatly influenced by the mixing/hydrodynamics of the system. The mixing within the system can also influence the production of possible foulants. For example, vessels not completely mixed (i.e. plug flow reactors) are more susceptible to the effects of shock loads which may cause cell lysis and release of soluble microbial products.

Many factors affect the hydrodynamics of wastewater processes and hence MBRs. These range from physical properties (e.g. mixture rheology and gas/liquid/solid density etc.) to the fluid boundary conditions (e.g. inlet/outlet/recycle flow rates, baffle/mixer position etc.). However, many factors are peculiar to MBRs, and these cover the filtration tank design (e.g. membrane type, multiple outlets attributed to membranes, membrane packing density, membrane orientation, etc.) and its operation (e.g. membrane relaxation, membrane backflush, etc.).

The mixing modeling and design techniques applied to MBRs are very similar to those used for conventional activated sludge systems. They include the relatively quick and easy compartmental modelling technique which will only derive the RTD of a process (e.g. the MBR) or the process unit (e.g. membrane filtration vessel) and relies on broad assumptions of the mixing properties of each sub-unit. Computational fluid dynamics modelling (CFD), on the other hand, does not rely on broad assumptions of the mixing characteristics and attempts to predict the hydrodynamics from a fundamental level. It is applicable to all scales of fluid flow and can reveal much information about the mixing in a process, ranging from the RTD to the shear profile on a membrane surface. Visualization of MBR CFD modeling results is shown in the image.

Investigations of MBR hydrodynamics have occurred at many different scales, ranging from examination of shear stress at the membrane surface to RTD analysis of the whole MBR. Cui et al. (2003) investigated the movement of Taylor bubbles through tubular membranes. Khosravi, M. (2007) examined the entire membrane filtration vessel using CFD and velocity measurements, while Brannock et al. (2007) examined the entire MBR system using tracer study experiments and RTD analysis.

Advantages 

 High quality effluent: With the small size of the mebrane's pore, the effluent is clear and pathogen free.
 Independent control of Solid Retention Time (SRT) and Hydrolic Retention Time (HRT): As all the biological solids are contained in the bioreactor, the SRT can be controlled independently from the HRT.
 Small footprint: Thanks to the membrane filtration, there is a high biomass concentration contained in a small volume.
 Robust to load variations: MBRs can be operated with a broad range of operation conditions.
 Compact process: Compared to the Conventional Activated sludge (CAS) the MBRs are more compact.

Market Framework

Regional insights 
The market of MBR is segmented based on end-user, which includes municipal and industrial, and geography, which comprises Europe, Middle East and Africa (EMEA), Asia-Pacific (APAC) and the Americas.

In this line, in 2016, some studies and reports showed that APAC region took the leadership position in terms of market share, owning 41.90% of it. On the other hand, EMEA's market share is approximately 31.34% and eventually the Americas own 26.67% of it.

APAC has the largest membrane bioreactors market. Developing economies, such as India, China, Indonesia, and the Philippines are majorly contributing to the growth. APAC is considered one of the most disaster-prone regions in the world. In 2013, thousands of people died from water-related disasters in the region, accounting for nine-tenth of the water-related deaths, globally. In addition to this, the public water supply system in the region is not as developed when compared to other countries, such as the US, Canada, the countries in Europe , etc.

The membrane bioreactors market in EMEA has witnessed stable growth. Countries as Saudi Arabia, the UAE, Kuwait, Algeria, Turkey, and Spain are majorly contributing to that growth rate. The scarcity of clean and fresh water is the key driver for the increasing demand for efficient water treatment technologies. In this regard, the increased awareness about water treatment and safe drinking water is also driving the growth.

Ultimately, the Americas has been witnessing major demand from countries, such as the US, Canada, Antigua, Argentina, Brazil, and Chile. MBR market has grown on account of stringent regulatory enforcement towards the safe discharge of wastewater. The claim of using this emerging technology comes mainly from the pharmaceuticals, food & beverages, automotive, and chemicals industries.

Summary about membrane bioreactors

The following points provide a summary of the features and improvements involved in dealing with membrane bioreactors.

 Reduction in equipment cost
 Reduction in space requirements
 Improve disinfection and gets a better-clarified water
 Product removes 95% to 99% of BOD, COD, Microorganism, and nutrients from effluent
 Life-time > 10 years

See also

List of waste-water treatment technologies
Activated sludge model
Membrane fouling
Hollow fiber membrane

References

Sewerage
Environmental engineering
Bioreactors
Membrane technology
Water treatment

it:Processo a membrana#Applicazioni della tecnologia MBR al trattamento delle acque reflue